Thaumatoneuridae is a family of damselflies in the order Odonata. There are at least three genera and about five described species in Thaumatoneuridae.

Genera
These three genera belong to the family Thaumatoneuridae:
 Paraphlebia Selys, 1861
 Thaumatoneura McLachlan, 1897
 † Eodysagrion Rust, Petrulevicius & Nel, 2008

References

Calopterygoidea
Odonata families